Philadelphia University is a university in Amman, Jordan. "Philadelphia" is the former name of Amman. The university was founded in 1989. It is located 20 km out of Amman on Jarash Road.

Ranking 
In 2016, the university was ranked 1,994 worldwide, and 31 in the Arab world, and 4 on the level of all Jordanian universities and the first in the Jordanian private universities, according to the Webometrics Rating.

Faculties and departments 

Philadelphia University is organized in eight faculties:
 Arts
 Science
 Nursing
 Engineering
 Law
 Pharmacy
 Information Technology
 Administrative & Financial Sciences

Faculty of Engineering 

The Faculty of Engineering was found out from the beginning of establishing the university. It contains 24 laboratories provided with the latest devices and technology.

The Faculty of Engineering is divided into departments:
 Mechanical Engineering
 Electrical Engineering
 Electronics and Communication Engineering
 Computer Engineering
 Mechatronics Engineering
 Civil Engineering
 Architecture
 Renewable Energy Engineering
 Web Engineering

Faculty of Arts 

 Arabic Language and Literature	
 English Language and Literature	
 Psychological Counseling
 Journalism
 Graphic Design	
 Interior Design	
 Development Studies

Faculty of Administrative and Financial Sciences 

 Accounting
 Business Administration	
 Banking and Finance	
 Marketing	
 Hotels and Tourism Management
 Hospital Management
 Business Systems and Networking Management

Faculty of Information Technology 

 Computer Science	
 Software Engineering	
 Management Information Systems

Faculty of Pharmacy 

 Pharmacy

Faculty of Science 

 Mathematics
 Biotechnology and Genetic Engineering

Faculty of Nursing 

 Nursing

Faculty of Law 

 Law

External links

Flags of the World
University portal

References 

 
Educational institutions established in 1989
Education in Amman
1989 establishments in Jordan